Boogie-Woogie String Along for Real is the final album recorded by jazz multi-instrumentalist Rahsaan Roland Kirk featuring performances by Kirk with string section and orchestra. It was recorded following a stroke which left him partially paralysed.

The Allmusic review by Thom Jurek states "The final album Rahsaan Roland Kirk ever recorded remains one of his finest. Post-stroke, Kirk struggled with his conception of the music he was trying to make. Boogie-Woogie String Along for Real is the payoff... The all-inclusive vision Kirk has of a music embraces all emotions and attitudes and leaves no one outside the door. This is Kirk's Black Classical Music, and it is fully realized on this final track and album".

Track listing 
All compositions by Rahsaan Roland Kirk except as indicated
 "Boogie Woogie String Along for Real" - 8:52
 "I Loves You, Porgy" (George Gershwin, Ira Gershwin, Dubose Heyward) - 1:51
 "Make Me a Pallet on the Floor" (Traditional) - 7:14
 "Hey Babebips" - 5:10
 "In a Mellow Tone" (Duke Ellington, Milt Gabler) - 6:15
 "Summertime" (Gershwin, Gershwin, Heyward) - 1:40
 "Dorthaan's Walk" - 7:08
 "Watergate Blues" (Percy Heath) - 6:35
 Recorded at Regent Sound Studios, NYC, 1977

Personnel 
 Roland Kirk: tenor saxophone, harmonica, electric kalimba, clarinet, flute, vocals
 Steve Turre: trombone (tracks (1, 4, 7 & 8)
 Hilton Ruiz: keyboards (tracks 4, 7 & 8)
 Phil Bowler: bass (tracks 1, 4, 7 & 8)
 Sonny Brown: drums (tracks 1, 4, 7 & 8)
 Percy Heath: cello (tracks 4 & 8)
 Sammy Price: piano (tracks 1-3, 5 & 6)
 Tiny Grimes: guitar (tracks 2, 3, 5 & 6)
 Arvell Shaw: bass (tracks 2, 3, 5 & 6)
 Gifford McDonald: drums (tracks 2, 3, 5 & 6)
 William S. Fischer: arranger, electric piano (track 1)
 Eddie Preston: trumpet (track 1)
 Jimmy Buffington: french horn (track 1)
 Harold Kohon, Sanford Allen, Kathryn Kienke, Regis Iandiorio, Tony Posk, Yoko Matsuo, Doreen Callender: violin (track 1)
 Selwart Clarke, Linda Lawrence, Julien Barber: viola (track 1)
 Eugene Moye, Jonathan Abramowitz, Charles Fambrough: cello (track 1)

References 

1977 albums
Warner Records albums
Rahsaan Roland Kirk albums
Albums produced by Joel Dorn